McNichol is a surname. Notable people with the surname include:

Brendon McNichol (born 1966), lap-steel/guitar player, played with various bands
Doug McNichol (born 1930), former professional Canadian football player
Duncan McNichol (born 1876), Scottish footballer
Jimmy McNichol (born 1961), former child star and brother of Kristy McNichol
John McNichol (born 1925), former footballer
Kristy McNichol (born 1962), former American actress and sister of Jimmy McNichol
Les McNichol (1932–2013), New Zealand rugby league player

See also
McNicol
McNicholl

Patronymic surnames